Scaptesyle bifasciata is a moth in the subfamily Arctiinae. It was described by Snellen in 1904. It is found on Java.

References

Natural History Museum Lepidoptera generic names catalog

Moths described in 1904
Lithosiini